Kolomban is a settlement in the City Municipality of Koper in the Littoral region of Slovenia on the border with Italy.

The local church is dedicated to Saint Bride and belongs to the Parish of Ankaran.

References

External links
Kolomban on Geopedia

Populated places in the City Municipality of Koper